The 2019 Ludwigshafen Challenger is a professional tennis tournament played on clay courts. It is the 1st edition of the tournament which is part of the 2019 ATP Challenger Tour. It takes place in Ludwigshafen, Germany between 1 and 7 July 2019.

Singles main-draw entrants

Seeds

 1 Rankings are as of 24 June 2019.

Other entrants
The following players received wildcards into the singles main draw:
  Daniel Altmaier
  Marek Gengel
  Johannes Härteis
  Julian Lenz
  Zsombor Piros
  Vincent Thierry Schneider

The following player received entry into the singles main draw as an alternate:
  Alex Molčan

The following players received entry into the singles main draw using their ITF World Tennis Ranking:
  Javier Barranco Cosano
  Riccardo Bonadio
  Corentin Denolly
  Sandro Ehrat
  Peter Heller
  Christopher Heyman
  Tim van Rijthoven

The following players received entry from the qualifying draw:
  Aleksandre Metreveli
  Renzo Olivo

Champions

Singles

  Yannick Hanfmann def.  Filip Horanský 6–3, 6–1.

Doubles

  Nathaniel Lammons /  Fernando Romboli def.  João Domingues /  Pedro Sousa 7–6(7–4), 6–1.

References

External links
Official Website

2019 ATP Challenger Tour
2019 in German tennis
July 2019 sports events in Germany